Glenn Hoddle (born 27 October 1957) is an English former football player and manager. He currently works as a television pundit and commentator for ITV Sport and BT Sport.

He played as a midfielder for Tottenham Hotspur, Monaco, Chelsea and Swindon Town and at international level for England. In 2007, he was inducted into the National Football Museum Hall of Fame, which cited him as one of the most gifted and creative English footballers of his generation, exhibiting "sublime balance and close control, unrivalled passing and vision and extraordinary shooting ability, both from open play and set pieces". He was also known for his tactical intelligence and work-rate.

He has been manager of Swindon Town (earning promotion to the Premier League), Chelsea (taking them to the FA Cup final), Southampton, Tottenham Hotspur (reaching a League Cup final) and Wolverhampton Wanderers. He managed England to the second round of the 1998 FIFA World Cup, where they lost to Argentina on penalties. He was dismissed from the England job in 1999 for a newspaper interview in which he was widely interpreted as saying that people with disabilities and others are affected by karma from past lives. He said that his words were "misconstrued, misunderstood and misinterpreted" and that disabled people had his "overwhelming support, care, consideration and dedication".

Early life
Hoddle was born on 27 October 1957 in Hayes, Middlesex to Derek Hoddle and Teresa Roberts, Soon after, the family moved to Harlow, Essex. Teresa Roberts established herself within the local darts community as the mixed double's partner of the local legend Rod Kingham who was also from Harlow  He attended Burnt Mill School in Harlow. He has been supporting Tottenham Hotspur since he was eight, and his favourite player was Martin Chivers. He first came to the attention of Spurs when Chivers and Ray Evans went to present prizes at a local school cup final and noticed the potential of the 11-year-old schoolboy, and on Chivers' recommendation he was invited to train with the club at Tottenham's practice ground in Cheshunt. At the age of 15, Hoddle played for Harlow-based Sunday league club Longmans alongside his father. Hoddle's uncle, Dave, was part of the Stansted team that won the 1984 FA Vase.

Playing career

Tottenham Hotspur

Hoddle joined the club as a junior when he was 12, and signed for the club as an apprentice on 17 April 1974. He successfully overcame knee problems in his early teens and collected eight England Youth caps, the first of these on 18 March 1975 against Spain. He made his Spurs first-team debut as a 17-year-old substitute for Cyril Knowles against Norwich City on 30 August 1975, a game that ended 2–2. Hoddle was forced to wait until 21 February 1976 to start a First Division match and immediately announced his arrival with the winning goal, a spectacular strike past Stoke City and England goalkeeper Peter Shilton.

He flourished under the management of Keith Burkinshaw and despite the club's relegation to the Second Division in 1976–77 after 27 seasons of First Division football, a Hoddle-inspired Spurs side won promotion to the top flight at the first attempt. As Tottenham's transitional phase continued, Hoddle's international career began on 15 December 1976 in an Under-21 friendly fixture against Wales. He would collect another eleven caps at that level, and play twice for the England 'B' team prior to scoring on his full international debut against Bulgaria on 22 November 1979.

The 1979–80 campaign heralded the emergence of Hoddle as a top-class player; the 22-year-old midfielder scored 19 goals in 41 league appearances and was awarded the PFA Young Player of the Year award at the end of the season. In 1981, he starred as Spurs won the FA Cup for the sixth time, defeating Manchester City after a replay. In the following season Tottenham retained the FA Cup (Hoddle scored in both the Final and Final replay) against Queen's Park Rangers and finished the League campaign in fourth place, the club's best league position since 1971. Hoddle performed as the midfield fulcrum in many of these successes and also contributed magnificently as the team reached the final of the League Cup, losing 3–1 to Liverpool, and the semi-final stage of the European Cup Winners Cup. During the summer of 1982, Hoddle played in two of England's matches in the opening group phase of the FIFA World Cup, starting against Kuwait after a substitute appearance in a 2–0 victory over Czechoslovakia.

Hoddle's involvement in the following three seasons was limited by a number of niggling injury problems (he started only 76 of a possible 126 league matches) but nevertheless, Hoddle proved to be the architect behind the team's 1984 UEFA Cup triumph despite missing the Final due to fitness concerns. In October 1983, he helped Spurs win 6–2 on aggregate against a Feyenoord Rotterdam side containing Johan Cruyff. Cruyff was dismissive of Hoddle before their first match, but after Hoddle's performance, Cruyff swapped shirts with Hoddle  as a sign of respect.

Spurs came close to further honours in the next three seasons, reaching third place in the First Division and the quarter-finals of the UEFA Cup in 1984–85 and another FA Cup Final in 1987, losing 3–2 to Coventry City, the only time the North London club has experienced defeat in the final of the famous knock-out competition. The unexpected loss to the Midlands side was Hoddle's last match for Spurs as newly appointed AS Monaco manager Arsène Wenger brought him to the principality for a fee of £750,000. Between 1975 and 1987, the gifted playmaker scored 110 goals in 490 first-team matches in all competitions, only four players (Steve Perryman, Pat Jennings, Gary Mabbutt and Cyril Knowles) have made more appearances in a Spurs shirt. At international level, Hoddle won 44 caps for England during his Tottenham career.

AS Monaco
Hoddle announced in 1987 that he would be leaving Tottenham Hotspur at the end of the season to pursue a career overseas where his style of play would be appreciated by continental managers and supporters, and to play European level football with English clubs banned after the Heysel disaster. He joined AS Monaco alongside George Weah and fellow Englishman Mark Hateley and immediately inspired the club to the 1988 Ligue 1 championship, its first league title in six seasons. Hoddle was voted the Best Foreign Player in French football and helped to guide the team to the quarter-finals of the European Cup in the 1988–89 campaign. Arsène Wenger, later the manager of Arsenal, was the coach who brought him to Monaco. However, a severe knee injury curtailed Hoddle's career at the highest level and in November 1990, the 33-year-old left the club by mutual consent, having helped to improve the standing of English footballers in foreign countries.

During his three and a half-year spell in France, Hoddle won a further nine England caps, making his international farewell against the Soviet Union in June 1988. He returned to England and signed for Chelsea on a non-contract basis to regain his fitness, leaving Stamford Bridge in March 1991 without playing a senior match to become player-manager of Swindon Town in the Second Division.

England international career
Hoddle made his debut alongside Kevin Reeves in England's Euro 80 qualifying tie against Bulgaria on 22 November 1979, scoring in a 2–0 win at Wembley. He scored in his third appearance against Australia on 31 May 1980 in a friendly in Sydney. His third goal came in his fifth appearance on 25 March 1981 in a game against Spain at Wembley, which England lost 2–1. He reached the 10-cap point of his career on 27 April 1982 in the British Home Championship clash with Wales in Cardiff, which England won 1–0. By this stage of his international career he had scored four goals.

He was included in the 1982 and 1986 FIFA World Cup squads, and England reached the quarter-finals against Argentina in the latter.

Hoddle also featured prominently in the European Championship squads of 1980 and 1988, making his 53rd and final international appearance in the final group game of Euro 88, in a 3–1 defeat to the Soviet Union in West Germany. He had scored eight goals for the England senior side in a career stretching nine years, the last of his international goals coming on 23 April 1986 in a 2–1 friendly win over Scotland at Wembley.

Managerial career

Swindon Town
When Hoddle arrived at Swindon in March 1991, the club was struggling in the aftermath of a financial scandal which had seen them stripped of promotion to the First Division at the end of the previous season, a controversy which had negatively impacted the team's league form as they had been forced to sell several key players including midfielder Alan McLoughlin.

Hoddle prevented Swindon from slipping into the Third Division and further improvement throughout the 1991–92 season saw the Wiltshire club finish in eighth place, just missing out on a play-off place. They had briefly led the table in October.

Swindon reached the playoffs of the rebranded Division One in 1993 and beat Leicester City 4–3 at Wembley, and were then promoted to the Premier League. Hoddle scored Swindon's first goal of the final.

By the time he guided Swindon to promotion, Hoddle was already being linked with managerial vacancies at bigger clubs. Just days after guiding Swindon to promotion, he accepted the offer to manage Chelsea and was succeeded at Swindon by his assistant John Gorman, who had been widely expected to follow him to Stamford Bridge.

Chelsea
In June 1993, Hoddle became player-manager of Chelsea. His assistant at Chelsea was the former Tottenham manager Peter Shreeves, and they reached the FA Cup final in Hoddle's first season, where they lost 4–0 to Manchester United. But United had done the double, and consolation for their failure to win the trophy came in the form of a European Cup Winners' Cup place - Chelsea's first European campaign for more than 20 years. Chelsea finished 14th in the league that season, memorably managing to inflict two of just four league defeats on the double winners that season, winning 1–0 at Stamford Bridge in September and 1–0 at Old Trafford in March, with Gavin Peacock scoring both times.

Chelsea reached the semi-finals of the European Cup Winners' competition in 1994–95 and lost by a single goal to Real Zaragoza, who went on to beat Arsenal in the final. Hoddle guided Chelsea to the FA Cup Semi-finals in 1995–96, but was unable to take them beyond 11th place in the Premiership – they had occupied this final position three times in four years. He did establish them as a force in cup competitions and made them capable of attracting top-class players – such as Ruud Gullit – to the club. Other notable signings were Mark Hughes, Dan Petrescu, Gavin Peacock, David Rocastle and Mark Stein.

England
Hoddle's three-year reign at Chelsea came to an end in the summer of 1996, after he had accepted the offer to manage the England national football team in place of Terry Venables after England's Euro 96 campaign, where they finished as semi-finalists as the host nation. He guided England to qualification for the 1998 World Cup, securing the team's automatic qualification with a 0–0 draw in Rome against Italy. He later caused controversy by omitting Paul Gascoigne from the squad and installing supposed faith healer Eileen Drewery as part of the England coaching staff, which led to the team being dubbed "The Hod Squad". They reached the second round of the 1998 tournament, losing on penalties to Argentina. Hoddle came under criticism after a disappointing start to the Euro 2000 qualifying campaign, leading to speculation that he would be sacked – particularly if England failed to qualify.

Hoddle's 60% win rate during his spell as manager is only bettered by Gareth Southgate, Sir Alf Ramsey, Fabio Capello and Sam Allardyce, (the last of whom managed only one game).

Dismissal from England job

On 30 January 1999, with the England team preparing for Euro 2000, and amidst the fall-out from the previous season's World Cup, Hoddle gave an interview to Matt Dickinson of The Times newspaper in an attempt to defend himself against his critics (over issues such as Eileen Drewery and his ideology.) and show a strong front for the remainder of the qualifiers.

Dickinson's interview reported that Hoddle had a "controversial belief that the disabled, and others, are being punished for sins in a former life." Hoddle's comments were criticised by several politicians including Sports Minister Tony Banks and Prime Minister Tony Blair. Public opinion, based upon the immediate media furore resulted in (according to one BBC poll) 90% of respondents believing Hoddle should not continue as England manager. The BBC survey showed that many considered his comments insensitive to disabled people, but others defended his right to express his religious beliefs by claiming that to sack him would constitute religious discrimination.

Hoddle said that he was unwilling to resign. He stated his words were misinterpreted and pointed out his contributions and commitment to organisations helping disabled people. The Football Association terminated Hoddle's contract on 2 February 1999, which was welcomed by representatives of disabled groups. The disabled rights campaigner Lord Ashley however, while criticising Hoddle's views, defended his right to express them, likening the campaign against Hoddle to a "witchhunt" and considered Hoddle's dismissal "a sad day for British tolerance and freedom of speech" Some writers considered the remarks were used as a pretext to get rid of him, speculating that under most circumstances Hoddle would likely have merely been reprimanded, but that the combination of the remarks, poor recent results, and rumoured discontent among the players was enough to cause the Football Association to terminate his contract. Hoddle apologised for the offence that had been caused, stating it had never been his intention and continued to fundraise for disabled groups after being dismissed.

Southampton
Hoddle was back in football within a year as Southampton manager, succeeding Dave Jones, who had been suspended to concentrate on clearing his name in connection with child abuse charges. Although these allegations were later found to be false, Jones was not reinstated and Hoddle continued as Southampton's manager, having arrived on the South Coast in January 2000. Hoddle kept the Saints in the Premier League with a 15th-place finish, but left in March 2001 to return to Tottenham as manager. Southampton were on course for a 10th-place finish – their highest since 1995 – when Hoddle left.

Tottenham Hotspur
Hoddle was appointed manager of Tottenham in March 2001 with John Gorman as his assistant, following the sacking of George Graham. His first match in charge was the FA Cup semi-final against north London rivals Arsenal which Spurs lost 2–1. The following year, Tottenham reached the League Cup final in February 2002; after winning 5–1 against Hoddle's former club Chelsea in the semi-final second leg, Spurs were the favourites but they lost 2–1 to Blackburn Rovers. The club's promising early season form (which saw Hoddle voted Premier League Manager of the Month for October 2001) dwindled away and they finished ninth in the Premiership.

Spurs began the 2002–03 season in fine form and Hoddle was named Premiership Manager of the Month for August 2002 after they ended the month top of the league. They finished in a disappointing 10th place at the end of the season. The pressure began to build up on Hoddle and he was sacked in September 2003 after a slow start to the season, in which the team picked up just four points from their opening six league games. His final game in charge was a 3–1 loss to his former side Southampton.

Wolverhampton Wanderers
Hoddle was linked with a return to Southampton in March 2004, but opposition from supporters meant chairman Rupert Lowe pursued alternative targets and ultimately selected Paul Sturrock instead. Instead he returned to management on 7 December 2004 with Wolverhampton Wanderers, again succeeding Dave Jones. Wolves lost only one of their remaining 25 games but failed to reach the play-offs because 15 of those games had been draws. In the 2005–06 season, drawing too many games again cost Wolves a top-six finish, with the club drawing 19 of their 46 league games. Wolves finished seventh, eight points off the playoffs. Some Wolves fans turned against Hoddle and there were chants against him during the last home game of the season against Watford. The board kept faith with Hoddle, but he stepped down on 1 July 2006, stating differing expectations between himself and the club as the reason for his departure. In his time with Wolverhampton Wanderers, the club drew 34 league games in his 76 games in charge, spanning over two seasons.

Football academy
By January 2008, Hoddle was attempting to raise the capital to form the Glenn Hoddle Academy based in Spain. The aim of the academy is to give another chance to young players released by football clubs in England to become professional players. Ikechi Anya was his first player at the academy to get a professional contract at a club, with Sevilla Atlético in Spain.

In June 2011, it was announced that The Glenn Hoddle Academy had linked up with English Conference North side Hyde. The Academy had previously enjoyed a link with the Spanish fourth-tier side Jerez Industrial, providing their entire squad and coaches, but fell out in a dispute over cash.

Management offers
Hoddle said in December 2013 that he been offered a chance to return to management no less than 26 times in seven years, but commented that he would not return to management until his academy was able to run itself.

In April 2014 he said he had come close to taking over from André Villas-Boas at Tottenham, before the job was given to Tim Sherwood. "I did have talks with Daniel Levy and the club," Hoddle said. "He wanted a little bit of advice and a bit of a sounding board for himself. [I said] 'I am there for you if you want me to take it to the end of the season and then we will have a little look at it then, I would be prepared to do that'. I wouldn't do it for any other club for that short period of time. It was just that it is in my DNA. I have loved my time at other clubs, I really have, but being a Spurs supporter since I was eight, going there very young, it is in my blood."

In August 2014, Hoddle was appointed first team coach at Queens Park Rangers under Harry Redknapp. However, on 3 February 2015, Redknapp resigned, following which Hoddle also left the club.

In June 2016, after England's 2–1 loss to Iceland at Euro 2016 and manager Roy Hodgson's subsequent resignation, Harry Redknapp and Alan Shearer both put forward Hoddle as a candidate for the job before Sam Allardyce was appointed.

Media career
Hoddle has done punditry work since his retirement from coaching. He has worked for ESPN, ITV Sport and BT Sport. Hoddle began working with ESPN during Euro 2012 as a pundit. Since then, he has worked with ITV for the 2014 FIFA World Cup, Euro 2016 and the 2018 World Cup. He also does punditry and co-commentary for BT Sport on their telecasts of the Premier League, FA Cup, Champions League and Europa League.

Singing career
In May 1987, Hoddle released the pop single "Diamond Lights'", which reached number 12 in the UK Singles Chart. It was a duet with his Spurs and England teammate Chris Waddle. The pair's follow up single 'It's Goodbye' only managed to reach 92 in the British charts.

In 2021, Hoddle appeared as a contestant on the second series of the British version of The Masked Singer, masked as the Grandfather Clock. He finished in 9th place.

Personal life
In 1986, while on holiday in Israel, Hoddle said that he had an experience which led him to become a born-again Christian.

Hoddle has been married twice, firstly to Christine Ann Stirling (1979–1998) and subsequently to Vanessa Colburn (2000–2015). He has three children with his first wife (Zara, Jamie and Zoe).

In 1996, his younger brother, former footballer Carl Hoddle, overdosed on paracetamol, but recovered. In March 2008, Carl Hoddle died at the age of 40 after collapsing suddenly from a brain aneurysm. Glenn Hoddle was reportedly "devastated" by the death of his brother.

On 27 October 2018, his 61st birthday, Hoddle suffered a cardiac arrest in a London TV studio and was taken to hospital for emergency heart surgery. The Guardian reported that he had been close to death and was saved by the actions of an employee at BT Sport, Simon Daniels, who knew how to use a defibrillator. On 23 November 2018, Hoddle left St Bartholomew's Hospital to recuperate at home after his hospital treatment.

In March 2021, Hoddle said he was "devastated" when he heard the news that Glenn Roeder had died aged 65, describing him as "a lovely guy and a really good coach." Roeder worked as a coach under Hoddle during his time as England manager.

Hoddle published his autobiography, Playmaker, in 2021.

Career statistics

Managerial statistics

Honours
Source:

Player
Tottenham Hotspur
FA Cup: 1980–81, 1981–82
FA Charity Shield: 1981 (shared)
UEFA Cup: 1983–84

AS Monaco
Division 1: 1987–88

Individual
PFA Young Player of the Year: 1979–80
PFA Second Division Team of the Year: 1977–78
PFA First Division Team of the Year: 1979–80, 1981–82, 1983–84, 1985–86, 1986–87
PFA Team of the Century (1977–1996): 2007
Division 1 Foreign Player of the Year: 1987–88
English Football Hall of Fame Inductee: 2007

Player Manager
Swindon Town 
Football League First Division play-offs: 1993

Chelsea
FA Cup runner-up: 1993–94

Manager
Tottenham Hotspur
Football League Cup runner-up: 2001–02

Individual
Premier League Manager of the Month: October 2001, August 2002

References

Bibliography

External links

Hoddle quotes 
Hoddle's football academy
Glenn Hoddle Collection at the National Football Collection
 
  
The Telegraph Glenn Hoddle Factfile.

1957 births
Living people
English Christians 
English evangelicals
Sportspeople from Harlow
Footballers from Hayes, Hillingdon
English footballers
Association football midfielders
Tottenham Hotspur F.C. players
AS Monaco FC players
Swindon Town F.C. players
Chelsea F.C. players
UEFA Cup winning players
English Football League players
Ligue 1 players
Premier League players
Outfield association footballers who played in goal
England under-21 international footballers
England B international footballers
England international footballers
UEFA Euro 1980 players
1982 FIFA World Cup players
1986 FIFA World Cup players
UEFA Euro 1988 players
English expatriate footballers
English expatriate sportspeople in Monaco
Expatriate footballers in Monaco
Association football player-managers
English football managers
Swindon Town F.C. managers
Chelsea F.C. managers
England national football team managers
Southampton F.C. managers
Tottenham Hotspur F.C. managers
Wolverhampton Wanderers F.C. managers
English Football League managers
Premier League managers
1998 FIFA World Cup managers
English Football Hall of Fame inductees
English association football commentators
FA Cup Final players
English autobiographers